The Carapacha Formation is a geological formation of the Sierra de Calencó, Carapacha Basin of La Pampa Province, Argentina whose strata date back to the Artinskian to Wuchiapingian of the Permian. The formation comprises two members, the lower Calencó member, named after the eponymous mountain range, and the Urre-Lauquen member, named after the Urre-Lauquen Lake bordering the range to the north.

The members are separated by an unconformity and represent a lacustrine (Calencó) and fluvial-dominated depositional environment. Ichnofossils of several groups of Permian reptiles and amphibians as well as flora have been retrieved from the formation. Traces on especially the Glossopteris leaves have been interpreted as suction tracks by arthropods.

Description 
The base of the formation cannot be observed and is covered and intruded by Permian-Triassic volcanic rocks of the Choiyoi Group.

The Carapacha Formation comprises red and gray arkosic or lithic sandstones, mudstones and rare conglomerates. The formation has been subdivided into two members, separated by an unconformity; the lower Calencó Member and the upper Urre-Lauquen Member. The lower member was deposited in a lacustrine environment, while braided fluvial environments dominate the upper member.

Fossil content 
The following fossils were reported from the formation:
 Ichnofossils
 Batrachichnus salamandroides
 Hyloidichnus bifurcatus
 Characichnos sp.
 cf. Amphisauropus sp.
 cf. Varanopus sp.

 Flora
 Cordaites sp.
 Dictyopteridium sp.
 Gangamopteris sp.
 Glossopteris sp.
 Neomariopteris sp.
 Paracalamites sp.
 Pecopteris sp.
 Phyllotheca sp.

See also 
 Ischigualasto Formation
 Irati Formation

References

Bibliography 

 
 
 

Geologic formations of Argentina
Permian System of South America
Permian Argentina
Artinskian Stage
Wuchiapingian
Sandstone formations
Mudstone formations
Fluvial deposits
Lacustrine deposits
Ichnofossiliferous formations
Permian southern paleotemperate deposits
Fossiliferous stratigraphic units of South America
Paleontology in Argentina
Geology of La Pampa Province